Fletchertown is a small village in the Allerdale borough of Cumbria, England. It was historically within Cumberland.

The village was originally built to house workers in a nearby coal mine, since abandoned. The site of the mine and its spoil heaps remain. The heaps are known locally as the 'pit bank' area. Fletchertown is also the home of a number of industrial units. The school closed in 1984 and now serves as a local community centre.

Location
Fletchertown is situated about 5 miles North of the Northern edge of the Lake District National Park.

Governance
The village is in the parliamentary constituency of Workington, Mark Jenkinson is the Member of parliament.

For Local Government purposes it is in the Boltons Ward of Allerdale Borough Council and the  Aspatria Ward of Cumbria County Council.

Fletchertown does not have its own parish council, instead it is part of Allhallows Parish Council. The Parish of Allhallows incorporates the three villages of Baggrow, Fletchertown and Watch Hill, together with the area of Mealsgate known as Pine Grove.

See also

Allhallows, Cumbria

References

External links

Historic pictures
Recent photograph and map

Villages in Cumbria
Allerdale